Paul Hagenmuller (August 3, 1921 – January 7, 2017) was a French chemist. Hagenmuller founded the Laboratoire de Chimie du Solide (Solid-State Chemistry Laboratory) of the French National Centre for Scientific Research (CNRS) and he served as its Director until 1985. He is considered "one of the founders of solid-state chemistry."

Biography 
Hagenmuller was born in 1921 in Alsace, France. After studying in Strasbourg and Clermont-Ferrand, during WW2, Hagenmuller was imprisoned in the Buchenwald and Mittelbau-Dora concentration camps. During those years, he was involved in sabotaging German missiles. In 1950 he received his PhD from Sorbonne University. Subsequently, he spent two years teaching as a lecturer (maître de conférences) in Vietnam. He returned to France in 1956 and was appointed Professor of Inorganic Chemistry at the University of Rennes, working on "nonstoichiometry in vanadium and tungsten bronzes, two-dimensional oxyhalogenides, borides, and silicides, magnetic spinels". In 1961 he started working at the University of Bordeaux.

Hagenmuller was noted for instigating cooperation between French researchers and researchers from the Soviet Union and Germany, his years in the concentration camps greatly affected his character. He also collaborated with noted scientists such as  John Goodenough, Jacques Friedel and Nevill Francis Mott on insulator-to-metal transitions of vanadium oxides. In the 1970s, he started working with Neil Bartlett on metal fluorides. His work on sodium-ion batteries received great interest years after it was published.

In 2018 Hagenmuller remained the 4th most cited author from the Journal of Solid State Chemistry.

Awards and decorations 

 Croix de Guerre 1939–1945
 Bundesverdienstkreuz (1985)
 Legion of Honour (1988)
 Gay-Lussac Humboldt Prize (1982)
 Prix de la Fondation de la Maison de la Chimie (1986)

Bibliography

References 

French chemists
University of Strasbourg alumni
University of Clermont-Ferrand alumni
Buchenwald concentration camp survivors
Mittelbau-Dora concentration camp survivors
1921 births
2017 deaths
Members of the French Academy of Sciences
University of Paris alumni
Recipients of the Legion of Honour
Recipients of the Croix de Guerre (France)
20th-century French chemists
Research directors of the French National Centre for Scientific Research
Academic staff of the University of Rennes
Academic staff of the University of Bordeaux
Inorganic chemists
Solid state chemists
Members of the Royal Swedish Academy of Sciences